Consequence of Chaos is an album by Italian-American jazz fusion and Latin jazz guitarist Al Di Meola, released in 2006. The album features guest appearances by Chick Corea, Steve Gadd, John Patitucci and Barry Miles.

Track listing
All songs written by Al Di Meola.
"San Marco (Moderna)" – 4:54
"Turquoise" – 7:28
"Odyssey" – 0:55
"Tao" – 6:01
"Azucar – 7:46
"Sanctuary" – 2:09
"Hypnose" – 4:48
"Red Moon" – 4:30
"Cry for You" – 4:14
"Just Three Words – 1:19
"Tempest" – 9:00
"Storm Off-Shore" – 1:06
"Black Pearls" – 3:06
"Africana Suite" – 4:46
"San Marco (Vecchio)" – 1:51

Personnel
Al Di Meola – acoustic guitar, electric guitar, keyboards, percussion
Chick Corea – acoustic piano
Barry Miles – acoustic piano, keyboards, marimba
Mario Parmisano – acoustic piano, keyboards
John Patitucci – acoustic bass, electric bass
Victor Miranda – electric bass, baby upright bass
Gumbi Ortiz – congas, percussion
Kornel Horvath – shaker, gato drum, udo
Steve Gadd – drums
Ernie Adams – drums, congas, bongos, percussion

Charts

References

2006 albums
Al Di Meola albums
Telarc Records albums